Manfred "Manny" Schellscheidt (born January 17, 1941) is a German-American soccer coach and former player. Born in Solingen in the Prussian Rhine Province, he emigrated to the United States in the 1970s. He spent three seasons in the North American Soccer League and one in the American Soccer League. He won two National Challenge Cup and one American Soccer League title as a player as well as two professional championships as a coach. Schellscheidt is a member of the National Soccer Hall of Fame.

Playing career
In 1964, Schellscheidt was visiting his aunt in New York when he was recruited by the coach of Elizabeth S.C. He played a handful of games before returning to Germany. After graduating from the German Sport University Cologne (Deutsche Sporthochschule Köln) in Cologne, Germany, in 1967, he played professionally for Union Solingen and SC Fortuna Köln before moving to the United States. When he arrived in the United States, he immediately rejoined Elizabeth S.C. of the German American Soccer League. He was a member of the team when it won both the 1970 and 1972 National Challenge Cups. In 1973, he signed with the Philadelphia Atoms of the North American Soccer League (NASL). The Atoms won the NASL title that year. In 1974, he became a player-coach with the Rhode Island Oceaneers in the American Soccer League. He took the team to the ASL championship and was named the 1974 ASL Coach of the Year. He returned to the NASL the next season with the Hartford Bicentennials.

Coaching career
After playing two seasons in Hartford, Schellscheidt became the head coach of the New Jersey Americans in 1977 winning another league title that season. He also coached in the North American Soccer League and in 1975 became coach of the United States national team. He also led the U.S. team in the 1984 Olympics qualifying. However, Schellscheidt was replaced four months before the start of the tournament, with a record of nine wins, 14 losses and 11 ties, by Alketas Panagoulias. The departure was contentious, with Schellscheidt saying of Gene Edwards, the USSF president at the time, "[he] told me they couldn't afford two coaches. That's funny, because they hadn't been paying me recently."

In 1988, Schellscheidt was named coach of the Seton Hall University men's team. The Pirates initially experienced success under Schellscheidt, winning two Big East championships, eight NCAA tournament berths, seven conference title game appearances and a trip to the NCAA Sweet 16 in 2001 while having had only one losing season during his first eighteen seasons at the helm.  The Pirates, however, have not been successful recently, posting losing records in 2007, 2008, 2009, and 2010 consecutively. Schellscheidt stepped down as the coach of Seton Hall on November 28, 2011.

In 1990, Schellscheidt was inducted into the National Soccer Hall of Fame.

Personal life
Schellscheidt resides in Union Township, Union County, New Jersey with his wife, Annette. Their son Karl Schellscheidt played soccer at Princeton University. They also have two daughters, Jackie and Janet.

In 1992, Schellscheidt published a book, Youth League: Soccer Skills – Mastering the Ball.

References

External links
Seton Hall Bio
National Soccer Hall of Fame
NASL stats
Philadelphia Atoms roster

1941 births
Living people
American non-fiction writers
American Soccer League (1933–1983) coaches
American soccer coaches
American soccer players
German-American Soccer League players
German footballers
German emigrants to the United States
German non-fiction writers
Connecticut Bicentennials players
National Soccer Hall of Fame members
North American Soccer League (1968–1984) coaches
People from the Rhine Province
People from Union Township, Union County, New Jersey
Philadelphia Atoms players
Rhode Island Oceaneers players
North American Soccer League (1968–1984) players
Seton Hall Pirates men's soccer coaches
SC Fortuna Köln players
Elizabeth S.C. players
United States men's national soccer team managers
Sportspeople from the New York metropolitan area
Soccer players from New Jersey
German male non-fiction writers
Association football midfielders
People from Helmstedt (district)
Player-coaches
New Jersey Americans (ASL) players
Princeton Tigers men's soccer coaches